Lake Van is the largest lake in Turkey. It lies in the far east of Turkey, in the provinces of Van and Bitlis in the Armenian highlands. It is a saline soda lake, receiving water from many small streams that descend from the surrounding mountains. A volcanic eruption blocked its original outlet in prehistoric times. Despite the high altitude and winter highs below , high salinity usually prevents it from freezing; the shallow northern section can freeze, but rarely.

Hydrology and chemistry

The western portion of the lake is deepest, with a large basin deeper than  lying northeast of Tatvan and south of Ahlat. The eastern arms of the lake are shallower.

The lake water is strongly alkaline (pH 9.7–9.8) and rich in sodium carbonate and other salts. Some is extracted in salt evaporation ponds alongside, used in or as detergents.

Geology
Lake Van is primarily a tectonic lake, formed more than 600,000 years ago by the gradual subsidence of a large block of the earth's crust due to movement on several major faults that run through this portion of Eastern Anatolia. The lake's southern margin demarcates: a metamorphic rock zone of the Bitlis Massif and volcanic strata of the Neogene and Quaternary periods. The deep, western portion of the lake is an antidome basin in a tectonic depression. This was formed by normal and strike-slip faulting and thrusting.

The lake's proximity to the Karlıova Triple Junction has led to molten fluids of the Earth's mantle accumulating in the strata beneath, still driving gradual change. Dominating the lake's northern shore is the stratovolcano Mount Süphan. The broad crater of a second, dormant volcano, Mount Nemrut, is close to the western tip of the lake. There is hydrothermal activity throughout the region.

For much of its history, until the Pleistocene, Lake Van has had an outlet towards the southwest. However, the level of this threshold has varied over time, as the lake has been blocked by successive lava flows from Nemrut volcano westward towards the Muş Plain. This threshold has then been lowered at times by erosion.

Bathymetry
The first acoustic survey of Lake Van was performed in 1974.

Kempe and Degens later identified three physiographic provinces comprising the lake: 
a lacustrine shelf (27% of the lake) from the shore to a clear gradient change
a steeper lacustrine slope (63%)
a deep, relatively flat basin province (10%) in the western center of the lake.

The deepest part of the lake is the Tatvan basin, which is almost completely bounded by faults.

Prehistoric lake levels

Land terraces (remnant dry, upper banks from previous shorelines) above the present shore have long been recognized. On a visit in 1898, geologist Felix Oswald noted three raised beaches at 15, 50 and 100 feet (5, 15 and 30 meters) above the lake then, as well as recently drowned trees. Research in the past century has identified many similar terraces, and the lake's level has fluctuated significantly during that time.

As the lake has no outlet, the level over recent millennia rests on inflow and evaporation.

The water level has vacillated greatly. Investigation by a team including Degens in the early 1980s determined that the highest lake levels ( above the current height) had been during the last ice age, about 18,000 years ago. This was followed by an equally-dramatic rise around 6,500 years ago.

As a deep lake with no outlet, Lake Van has accumulated great amounts of sediment washed in from surrounding plains and valleys, and occasionally deposited as ash from eruptions of nearby volcanoes.

Although these cores only penetrated the first few meters of sediment, they provided sufficient varves to give proxy climate data for up to 14,570 years BP.

A team of scientists headed by palaeontologist Professor Thomas Litt at the University of Bonn has applied for funding from the International Continental Scientific Drilling Program (ICDP) for an akin deeper-drilling project. This expects to find it "stores the climate history of the last 800,000 years—an incomparable treasure house of data which we want to tap for at least the last 500,000 years." A test drilling in 2004 detected evidence of 15 volcanic eruptions in the past 20,000 years.

Recent lake level change

Similar but smaller fluctuations have been seen recently. The level of the lake rose by at least  during the 1990s, drowning much agricultural land, and (after a brief period of stability and then retreat) seems to be rising again.

Climate
It is in the highest and largest region of Turkey, which has a Mediterranean-influenced humid continental climate. Average temperatures in July are between 22 and 25 °C, and in January between −3 °C to −12 °C. On some cold winter nights the temperature has reached −30 °C.

The lake, particularly on urban townscape shore tempers the climate, in the city of Van, where the average temperature in July is 22.5 °C, and in January −3.5 °C. The average annual rainfall in the basin, ranges from 400 to 700 mm.

Ecology

Prior to 2018, the only fish known to live in the brackish water of Lake Van was Chalcalburnus tarichi or Pearl Mullet, a Cyprinid fish related to chub and dace, which is caught during the spring floods. In May and June, these fish migrate from the lake to less alkaline water, spawning either near the mouths of the rivers feeding the lake or in the rivers themselves. After spawning season it returns to the lake. In 2018, a new species of fish, which is deemed as Oxynoemacheilus ercisianus, has been discovered inside a microbialite.

103 species of phytoplankton have been recorded in the lake including cyanobacteria, flagellates, diatoms, green algae, and brown algae. 36 species of zooplankton have also been recorded including Rotatoria, Cladocera, and Copepoda in the lake.

These are solid towers on the lake bed formed by coccoid cyanobacteria (Pleurocapsa group) these create mats of aragonite that combine with calcite precipitating out of the lake water.

The region hosts the rare Van cat breed of cat, having – among other things – an unusual fascination with water. The lake is mainly surrounded by fruit orchards and grain fields, interspersed by some non-agricultural trees.

Monster

Apart from some amateur photographs and videos, there is no physical evidence to prove its existence. The profile resembles an extinct mosasaurus or basilosaurus.

History

Tushpa, the capital of Urartu, near the shores, on the site of what became medieval Van's castle, west of present-day Van city. The ruins of the medieval city of Van are still visible below the southern slopes of the rock on which Van Castle stands.

In 2017, archaeologists from Van Yüzüncü Yil University and a team of independent divers who were exploring Lake Van reported the discovery of a large underwater fortress spanning roughly one kilometer. The team estimates that this fortress was constructed during the Urartian period, based on their visual assessments. The archaeologists believe that the fortress, along with other parts of the ancient city that surrounded it at the time, had slowly become submerged over the millennia by the gradually rising lake.

Armenian kingdoms

The lake was the centre of the Armenian kingdom of Ararat from about 1000 BC, afterwards of the Satrapy of Armenia, Kingdom of Greater Armenia, and the Armenian Kingdom of Vaspurakan.

Along with Lake Sevan in today's Armenia and Lake Urmia in today's Iran, Van was one of the three great lakes of the Armenian Kingdom, referred to as the seas of Armenia (in ancient Assyrian sources: "tâmtu ša mât Nairi" (Upper Sea of Nairi), the Lower Sea being Lake Urmia). Over time, the lake was known by various Armenian names, including .

East Roman Empire
By the 11th century the lake was on the border between the East Roman Empire, with its capital at Constantinople, and the Turko-Persian Seljuk Empire, with its capital at Isfahan. In the uneasy peace between the two empires, local Armenian-Byzantine landowners employed Turcoman gazis and Byzantine akritai for protection. The Greek-speaking Byzantines called the lake Thospitis limne.

In the second half of the 11th century Emperor Romanus IV Diogenes launched a campaign to re-conquer Armenia and head off growing Seljuk control. Diogenes and his large army crossed the Euphrates and confronted a much smaller Seljuk force led by Alp Arslan at the Battle of Manzikert, north of Lake Van on 26 August 1071. Despite their greater numbers, the cumbersome Byzantine force was defeated by the more mobile Turkish horsemen and Diogenes was captured.

Seljuk Empire

Alp Arslan divided the conquered eastern portions of the Byzantine empire among his Turcoman generals, with each ruled as a hereditary beylik, under overall sovereignty of the Seljuq Empire. Alp Arslan gave the region around Lake Van to his commander Sökmen el-Kutbî, who set up his capital at Ahlat on the western side of the lake. The dynasty of Shah-Armens, also known as Sökmenler, ruled this area from 1085 to 1192.

The Ahlatshahs were succeeded by the Ayyubid dynasty.

Ottoman Empire
Following the disintegration of the Seljuq-ruled Sultanate of Rum, Lake Van and its surroundings were conquered by the Ilkhanate Mongols, and later switched hands between the Ottoman Empire and Safavid Iran until Sultan Selim I took control for good.

Reports of the Lake Van Monster surfaced in the late 1800s and gained popularity. A news article was published by Saadet Gazetesi issue number 1323, dated 28 Shaban 1306 Hijri year, corresponding to 29 April 1889 during the reign of Sultan Abdul Hamid II.

Architecture
Near the Van Fortress and the southern shore, on Akdamar Island lies the 10th century Cathedral of the Holy Cross, Aghtamar (Surb Khach), which served as a royal church to the kingdom of Vaspurakan. The ruins of Armenian monasteries also exist on the other three islands of Lake Van: Lim, Arter, and Ktuts. The area around Lake Van was also the home to a large number Armenian monasteries, among the most prominent of these being the 10th century Narekavank and the 11th century Varagavank, the former now destroyed.

The Ahlatshahs left a large number of historic headstones in and around the town of Ahlat. Local administrators are currently trying to have the tombstones included in UNESCO's World Heritage List, where they are currently listed tentatively.

Transportation
The railway connecting Turkey and Iran was built in the 1970s, sponsored by CENTO. It uses a train ferry (ferry for decanted passengers) across between the cities Tatvan and Van, rather than building tracks around rugged terrain. This limits passenger capacity. In May 2008 talks started between Turkey and Iran to replace the ferry with a double-track electrified railway.

In December 2015 the new generation of train ferries operated by the Turkish State Railways, the largest of their kind in Turkey, entered service in Lake Van.

Ferit Melen Airport abuts Van. Turkish Airlines, AnadoluJet, Pegasus Airlines, and SunExpress are the airlines which have regular flights.

Sports

Lake Van occasionally hosts several water sports, sailing, and inshore powerboat racing events, such as the UIM World Offshore 225 Championship's IOC Van Grand Prix, and the Van Lake Festival.

Islands

 Adır Island
 Akdamar Island
 Çarpanak Island
 Kuş Island

See also
 List of lakes of Turkey
 Ark of Nuh or Noah
 Mount Judi

Notes

References

Sources

 
 
 
 
 
 
 
 
 
 
 
 
 
 
 
 
 
 
 
 
 
 
 
 

 
Eastern Anatolia Region
Van
Van
Van
Landforms of Van Province
Landforms of Bitlis Province
Van